Li Lianghui (born May 1940) is a lieutenant general in the People's Liberation Army of China. He was a member of the 15th Central Committee of the Chinese Communist Party. He was a member of the Standing Committee of the 10th Chinese People's Political Consultative Conference.

Biography
Li was born in Shen County (now Shenzhou), Hebei, in May 1940. In June 1958, he became an apprentice in the Garage of the Logistics Department of the Beijing Military Region. He enlisted in the People's Liberation Army (PLA) in September 1961, and joined the Chinese Communist Party (CCP) in December 1963. He served in the People's Liberation Army Air Force Airborne Corps for a long time and eventually became its commander in May 1983. On 8 September 2000, a vehicle carrying military ammunition and materials was destroyed by the garrison exploded on the Xishan Road in the western suburb of Ürümqi, Xinjiang, killing at least 73 people, injuring more than 300 people, and damaging more than 30 cars and nearby houses. Li and his partner , political commissar of the Xinjiang Military Region, both were removed from office by the Central Military Commission. In January 2001, Li was transferred to the Jinan Military Region and appointed deputy commander, and served until 2003.

He was promoted to the rank of major general (shaojiang) in July 1990 and lieutenant general (zhongjiang) in July 1998.

References

1940 births
Living people
People from Shenzhou City
PLA National Defence University alumni
People's Liberation Army generals from Hebei
People's Republic of China politicians from Hebei
Chinese Communist Party politicians from Hebei
Members of the 15th Central Committee of the Chinese Communist Party
Members of the Standing Committee of the 10th Chinese People's Political Consultative Conference